The 1952 United States presidential election in Wisconsin was held on November 4, 1952 as part of the 1952 United States presidential election. State voters chose 12 electors to the Electoral College, who voted for president and vice president.

Background
Politics in Wisconsin since the Populist movement had been dominated by the Republican Party. The Democratic Party became uncompetitive away from the Laue Michigan coast as the upper classes, along with the majority of workers who followed them, fled from William Jennings Bryan's agrarian and free silver sympathies. Although the state did develop a strong Socialist Party to provide opposition to the GOP, Wisconsin developed the direct Republican primary in 1903 and this ultimately created competition between the "League" under Robert M. La Follette, and the conservative "Regular" faction. This ultimately would develop into the Wisconsin Progressive Party in the late 1930s, which was opposed to the conservative German Democrats and to the national Republican Party, and allied with Franklin D. Roosevelt at the federal level.

During the two wartime elections, the formerly Democratic German counties in the east of the state – which had been powerfully opposed to the Civil War because they saw it as a "Yankee" war and opposed the military draft instituted during it – viewed Communism as a much greater threat to America than Nazism and consequently opposed President Roosevelt's war effort. Consequently, these historically Democratic counties became virtually the most Republican in the entire state, and with the fall of the Progressive Party that had provided the main opposition to the Republicans in the 1930s, the state sent an all-Republican congressional delegation to the 80th Congress for the first time since the 71st, and Democratic representation in the state legislature reached the lowest level since that same date, although it improved to a quarter of the state House in 1950.

During the second term of now-unpopular President Truman, populist conservative Wisconsin Senator Joe McCarthy became notorious for his investigations into Communists inside the American government. It was thought that he would be a hindrance both to Democratic nominee Adlai Stevenson II, and to Republican nominee Dwight D. Eisenhower. Stevenson would call for McCarthy's defeat during his campaign in the state because he thought Eisenhower was using unfair political tactics, that Eisenhower was a "scaremonger", and that the Republican Party was the "Same Old Political Hokum".

Vote
Polls in the state during the third week of October showed that most voters were for Eisenhower, although it was thought Stevenson was gaining. The poll however said that if Stevenson was to carry Wisconsin he would be required to win over a large majority of undecided voters. The probability of Stevenson achieving this was made more remote by a poll near the end of October that showed him trailing Eisenhower amongst Wisconsin's farmers by a two-to-one.

As it turned out, Eisenhower nearly matched the poll of farmers a week before the election, carrying Wisconsin by 22.25 points for the best Republican performance in the state since Warren G. Harding carried the state in 1920. Eisenhower carried all but three counties – Kenosha in the urban far south and the two Scandinavian unionized mining and industrial counties of Douglas and Iron. His large victory was due to the unpopularity of the Korean War in a traditionally isolationist state, to ongoing fear of Communist subversion in those German Catholic regions that had turned against the Democrats during the 1940s, and to solid traditional Yankee support in the southern interior.

Eisenhower’s victory was the first of three consecutive Republican victories in the state, as Wisconsin would not vote Democratic again until Lyndon B. Johnson’s landslide victory in 1964.

Results

Results by county

See also
 United States presidential elections in Wisconsin

References

Wisconsin
1952
1952 Wisconsin elections